Dar Parchin or Darparchin may refer to:
 Dar Parchin-e Olya
 Dar Parchin-e Sofla